Radek Gardoň (born April 19, 1969) is a Czech former professional ice hockey centre.

Gardoň played 600 games in the Czech Extraliga, playing for HC Kladno, HC Vsetín and HC Zlín. He also played two seasons in the Japan Ice Hockey League for Furukawa Ice Hockey Club between 1997 and 1999.

Gardoň played in the 1988 and 1989 World Junior Ice Hockey Championships for Czechoslovakia.

References

External links

1969 births
Living people
EC Bad Tölz players
Czech ice hockey centres
Rytíři Kladno players
HC Tábor players
VHK Vsetín players
PSG Berani Zlín players
Czech expatriate sportspeople in Japan
Czechoslovak ice hockey centres
Czech expatriate ice hockey players in Germany
Expatriate ice hockey players in Japan